The Hump is a summit in Alberta, Canada.

The Hump's name comes from the Cree Indians of the area, who likened the summit to a buffalo's hump.

References

Hills of Alberta